Osip Maksimovich Bodyansky (romanized: Osyp Maksymovych Bodianskyi; 1808–1877) was a notable Russian Imperial Slavist of Ukrainian Cossack descent who studied and taught at the Imperial Moscow University. Bodyansky's close friends included Nikolai Gogol, Sergey Aksakov, Mikhail Katkov, Taras Shevchenko, Mikhail Maksimovich and Pavel Jozef Šafárik. He was elected a corresponding member of the Imperial Academy of Sciences (Saint Petersburg) in 1854.

Biography
Bodyansky was born in old Ruthenian town of Varva, Poltava Governorate (today Chernihiv Oblast) and later the Pereyaslav Seminary. He, as a student in Moscow, entered Stankevich's circle of intellectuals. After getting his master's degree, he was at work rummaging obscure libraries and archives of Little Russia. Such activities brought to light a splattering of important documents, such as the illustrated Peresopnytsia Gospels and the History of the Rus which is considered controversial in Russia.

Bodyansky's publication of Giles Fletcher's sketch of Muscovy  was deemed an act of Russophobia and incurred the displeasure of Tsar Nicholas I, leading to the scholar's departure from Moscow to Kazan. In his 30s, Bodyansky travelled in the Slavic countries on behalf of the Russian government, in order to study their languages, literature, and societies. Having for long moved in Slavophile and Pan-Slavist circles, he spent some time working in Prague with Šafárik. Upon his return he became professor in Moscow, where he died in 1878. His tomb is in the Novodevichy Convent.

Bodyansky was one of the first serious scholars of the Ukrainian language and wrote some amateur poetry in his native tongue. His master's dissertation involved a comparison of Ukrainian and Russian folks songs. Bodyansky's chief work was editing the Treatises of the Moscow Society for Russian History and Antiquities (1846–49 and 1858–78). Of his own works, notable are On the Folk Poetry of the Slavic Tribes (1837) and On the Time of Origin of the Slavic Script (1855).

Gallery

References

Bibliography

External links
 Bodiansky, Osyp. Encyclopedia of Ukraine
 Осип Максимович Бодянский. www.hrono.ru.
 БОДЯ́НСКИЙ. bigenc.ru
 БОДЯНСЬКИИ. leksika.com.ua (Ukrainian Soviet Encyclopedia – URE)
 БОДЯНСЬКИЙ ОСИП МАКСИМОВИЧ. history.org.ua (edited by Petro Tronko)

1808 births
1878 deaths
People from Varva, Chernihiv Oblast
People from Poltava Governorate
Corresponding members of the Saint Petersburg Academy of Sciences
Russian ethnographers
Historians from the Russian Empire
Ukrainian poets
Memoirists from the Russian Empire
Slavists
Burials at Novodevichy Cemetery
Russian educators
Moscow State University alumni
Academic staff of Moscow State University
19th-century poets
19th-century historians from the Russian Empire
Professorships at the Imperial Moscow University
Imperial Moscow University alumni